Storgosia was a Roman road station and later a fortress, located in the modern Kaylaka Park in the vicinity of modern Pleven (North-central Bulgaria). 

It accommodated detachments of Legio I Italica's Novae (modern Svishtov) garrison. The station grew to become a fortress in Late Antiquity due to Gothic and other Barbarian raids after 238.

The fortress existed until the end of the 6th century, when the settlement of the Slavs apparently led to its abandonment and during the rule of the Ottoman Empire  the fortress was practically destroyed (probably in the 16th century), so that the stones could be used for the construction of a wall around the Turkish barracks in Pleven.

References

6th-century disestablishments
Buildings and structures in Pleven Province
Former populated places in Bulgaria
Roman towns and cities in Bulgaria
Roman waystations in Bulgaria
Castles in Bulgaria
Moesia Inferior
Pleven